The State Register of Heritage Places is maintained by the Heritage Council of Western Australia. , 110 places are heritage-listed in the City of Belmont, of which seven are on the State Register of Heritage Places.

List
The Western Australian State Register of Heritage Places, lists the following seven state registered places within the City of Belmont:

References

Belmont